The Spring Stakes is a South Australian Jockey Club Group 3 Thoroughbred horse race at Weight for age, over a distance of 1200 metres, held annually at Morphettville Racecourse, Adelaide, Australia in August.  Total prizemoney is A$127,250.

History
Prior to 2006 the race was held in September. The event is the first Group race in the new racing calendar in South Australia.
Race named in 2016 in honour of David R Coles who made a significant contribution to thoroughbred racing industry by the former SAJC Chairman, and pre-eminent Bloodstock agent and consultant. Coles was inducted into the South Australian Racing Hall of Fame in 2003 and into the Australian Racing Hall of Fame in 2013.

Distance
1970–1971 -  6 furlongs (~1200 metres)
1972–1978 –  1200 metres
1979–1980 –  1350 metres (Held at Cheltenham Park Racecourse) 
1981–2000 – 1200 metres
2001 – 1250 metres (Held at Cheltenham Park Racecourse) 
2002 onwards - 1200 metres

Grade
1970–1978 - Principal Race
1979–1997 - Group 2
1998 onwards - Group 3

Winners

 2022 - Calypso Reign
 2021 - Behemoth 
 2020 - Behemoth
 2019 - Dalasan
 2018 - Dollar For Dollar
 2017 - Mio Dio
 2016 - Beirut
 2015 - Red Eclipse
 2014 - Riziz
 2013 - Just Discreet
 2012 - Happy Trails
 2011 - Uxorious
 2010 - Rebel Raider
 2009 - Midnight Mustang
 2008 - El Maze
 2007 - Zupaone
 2006 - Royal Ida
 2005 - Super Elegant
 2004 - Sky Cuddle
 2003 - Squillani
 2002 - Strategic Image
 2001 - Flavour
 2000 - Spice Doll
 1999 - Star Joe
 1998 - Will Fly
 1997 - Hero Wind
 1996 - Staaraq
 1995 - Hero Wind
 1994 - Hero Wind
 1993 - Colebrook
 1992 - Black Rouge
 1991 - Beau George
 1990 - Redelva
 1989 - Redelva
 1988 - Redelva
 1987 - Change Of Habit
 1986 - Romantic Red
 1985 - Trichelle
 1984 - Gold Kildare
 1983 - Belcunda
 1982 - Oriental Ruler 
 1981 - Bargambler
 1980 - Rumpus Room
 1979 - Court Sabre
 1978 - Pelican Point
 1977 - Hartbalm
 1976 - Classic Conquest
 1975 - Samist
 1974 - Samist
 1973 - Toltrice
 1972 - High Gypsy
 1971 - Romantic Son
 1970 - Eastern Court

See also
List of Australian Group races
Group races

References

Horse races in Australia
Open sprint category horse races
Sport in Adelaide